Lucille Bogan (born Lucile Anderson; April 1, 1897August 10, 1948) was an American classic female blues singer and songwriter, among the first to be recorded. She also recorded under the pseudonym Bessie Jackson. Music critic Ernest Borneman noted that Bogan was one of "the big three of the blues", along with Ma Rainey and Bessie Smith. Many of Bogan's songs have been recorded by later blues and jazz musicians.

Many of her songs were sexually explicit, and she is generally considered to have been a "dirty blues" musician.

In 2022, she was inducted into the Blues Hall of Fame.

Life and career
She was born Lucile  Anderson, the daughter of Gussie and Wylie Anderson.  According to some sources, she was born in Amory, Mississippi, but according to her entry in the 1900 census her birthplace was Birmingham, Alabama. In 1914, she married Nazareth Lee Bogan, a railwayman, and gave birth to a son, Nazareth Jr., in either 1915 or 1916. She later divorced Bogan and married James Spencer.

She first recorded vaudeville songs for Okeh Records in New York in 1923, with the pianist Henry Callens. Later that year she recorded "Pawn Shop Blues" in Atlanta, Georgia; this was the first time a black blues singer had been recorded outside New York or Chicago. In 1927 she began recording for Paramount Records in Grafton, Wisconsin, where she recorded her first big success, "Sweet Petunia", which was covered by Blind Blake. She also recorded for Brunswick Records, backed by Tampa Red.

By 1930, her songs tended to concern drinking and sex, such as "Sloppy Drunk Blues" (written and first recorded by Bogan but released first by Leroy Carr in 1930 then by Bogan the following year, later recorded by others) and "Tricks Ain't Walkin' No More" (later recorded by Memphis Minnie). She also recorded the original version of "Black Angel Blues", which (as "Sweet Little Angel") was covered by B. B. King and many others. With her experience in some of the rowdier juke joints of the 1920s, many of Bogan's songs, most of which she wrote herself, have thinly veiled humorous sexual references. The theme of prostitution, in particular, featured prominently in several of her recordings. One of these was "Groceries on the Shelf (Piggly Wiggly)", which was originally written and recorded by Charlie "Specks" McFadden. Piggly Wiggly is the name of a successful American supermarket chain, operating in the South and the Midwest, which first opened in 1916. Bogan used the self-service notion in her amended lyrics to the song, part of which ran, "My name is Piggly Wiggly and I swear you can help yourself, And you've got to have your greenback, and it don't take nothin' else".

In 1933, she returned to New York, and, apparently to conceal her identity, began recording as Bessie Jackson for the Banner label of ARC. She was usually accompanied on piano by Walter Roland, with whom she recorded over 100 songs between 1933 and 1935, including some of her biggest commercial successes, "Seaboard Blues", "Troubled Mind", and "Superstitious Blues". Her other songs include "Stew Meat Blues", "Coffee Grindin' Blues", "My Georgia Grind" (when accompanied on piano by Charles Avery), "Honeycomb Man", "Mr. Screw Worm in Trouble", and "Bo Hog Blues".

Her final recordings with Roland and Josh White include two takes of "Shave 'Em Dry", recorded in New York on Tuesday, March 5, 1935. The unexpurgated alternate take is notorious for its explicit sexual references, a unique record of the lyrics sung in after-hours adult clubs. According to Keith Briggs' liner notes for Document Records Complete Recordings, these were recorded either for the fun of the recording engineers, or for "clandestine distribution as a 'Party Record.'" Briggs notes that Bogan seems to be unfamiliar with the lyrics, reading them as she sings them, potentially surprised by them herself. Another of her songs, "B.D. Woman's Blues", takes the position of a "bull dyke" ("B.D."), with the lyrics "Comin' a time, B.D. women, they ain't gonna need no men", "They got a head like a sweet angel and they walk just like a natural man" and "They can lay their jive just like a natural man."

She appears not to have recorded after 1935. She managed her son's jazz group, Bogan's Birmingham Busters, for a time, before moving to Los Angeles shortly before her death from coronary sclerosis in 1948. She is interred at the Lincoln Memorial Park, in Carson, California.

In 2022, she was posthumously inducted into the Blues Hall of Fame. The citation noted that "Bogan recorded some of the most memorable blues songs of the pre-World War II era, including some that were landmarks in blues and some that continue to sensationalize her reputation decades after her death".

References

1897 births
1948 deaths
People from Amory, Mississippi
Classic female blues singers
20th-century African-American women singers
American blues singers
Paramount Records artists
Dirty blues musicians
Okeh Records artists
Musicians from Birmingham, Alabama
20th-century American singers
20th-century American women singers